Paganitzu is a  puzzle video game created by Keith Schuler and published by Apogee Software for IBM PC compatibles in 1991. It is the sequel to Chagunitzu. The player controls Alabama "Al" Smith, who works his way through an ancient Aztec pyramid while solving Sokoban-like puzzles.

Paganitzu was published in three episodes: "Romancing the Rose","The Silver Dagger," and "Jewel of the Yucatan." The first was distributed as shareware. In 2015, it was re-released on Steam with Microsoft Windows and macOS support.

Gameplay

The object of the game is to collect all the keys in a level to unlock the exit and try not to get killed by monsters and traps. However the object of the third episode is to reach the statue with the yellow stone. Each episode has 20 levels, but episode 3 has one more playable level and four secret unplayable levels from Chagunitzu. Treasures can be collected for points and special encounters can be found for 500 points each. Some of the walls can be walked into to reveal secret passages. Dirt can be uncovered and rocks can be pushed around. Rocks pushed into water, lava or slime turn the spot into solid terrain. Each episode has different puzzles and enemy tackling.

Episode 1
Spiders can be killed by being cloistered in one square, which destroys anything but walls and Alabama around them and leaves behind some gems. If water pipes are destroyed the water will stop flowing. Certain spots teleport Alabama around the level. One trap Alabama will frequently face are spears that elongate and try to plunge into Alabama. Those traps can be disarmed by hitting something else that gets in their path as they elongate. Once disarmed, they block a certain amount of space. Also there are snakes that spit fire horizontally if Alabama crosses their path and to pass them, they must have an item, spider or boulder blocking their view. One unique puzzle requires Alabama to shed some light in a dark level before it can be completed.

Episode 2
Enemies in this episode cannot be killed and must be avoided at all costs. Levers in many of the levels can be pulled to switch flame traps on and off. One unique puzzle requires Alabama to pull a set of levers in the correct sequence.

Episode 3
Skeleton Lizards are completely harmless enemies that only obstruct Alabama. There are living pods that fire projectiles horizontally and vertically and must be dealt with in the same manner as the snakes. Throughout the levels Alabama will encounter statues with different functions. A statue with a yellow stone is used to exit to the next level. A statue with green arrows can be passed uni-directionally either horizontally or vertically. A statue with a blue stone is used to invert the arrows of a green statue. A statue with a red stone is used to remove one part of water. One unique puzzle requires Alabama to navigate through a maze of invisible walls.

References

External links
Official 3D Realms page

1991 video games
Apogee games
DOS games
MacOS games
Puzzle video games
Video games developed in the United States
Video games set in Mexico
Windows games
Single-player video games